The arms of his "ill"  is the title of a 10-inch  EP by the band The Hidden Cameras.

The EP was released in 2004 on the Berkeley, California-based label, Absolutely Kosher.  It was later re-released as a CD also. All songs were written, performed and recorded by Joel Gibb. The EP features Lex Vaughn (drums on #2 and #5), Owen Pallett (viola on #6) and Michael Olsen (cello on #6). All other instruments were played by Joel Gibb. It was mixed by Ohad Benchetrit and Joel Gibb.

The arms of his "ill"   features artwork by five different artists. The front cover painting is by Paul P., and the back cover drawing is by G.B. Jones. The front insert is by Will Munro and the back insert by Daryl Vocat. Labels for both sides are by Luis Jacob.

Track listing

Side A

 Music Is My Boyfriend
 Bboy
 In the Union of Wine

Side B

 Doot Doot Plot
 Fear Is On
 Builds the Bone
 Mississauga Goddamn

External links 
The Hidden Cameras
Daryl Vocat

The Hidden Cameras albums
2004 EPs